The Municipality of Markovci is a municipality in the traditional region of Styria in northeastern Slovenia. The seat of the municipality is the town of Markovci. Markovci became a municipality in 1998.

Settlements
In addition to the municipal seat of Markovci, the municipality also includes the following settlements:

 Borovci
 Bukovci
 Nova Vas pri Markovcih
 Prvenci
 Sobetinci
 Stojnci
 Strelci
 Zabovci

References

External links

Municipality of Markovci on Geopedia
Markovci municipal site

Markovci
1998 establishments in Slovenia